Hori may refer to:

Ancient Egypt
Sewadjkare Hori, late 13th dynasty Pharaoh, also known as Hori II
Hori (High Priest of Osiris) Son of Wennenufer and High Priest of Osiris during the reign of Ramesses II (19th dynasty)
Hori I (High Priest of Ptah), a High Priest of Ptah  at the very end of the reign of Ramesses II
Hori (High Priest), a High Priest of Anhur during the reign of Ramesses II
Hori II (Vizier), a Vizier during the 19th and 20th dynasties of Ancient Egypt
Hori I (Viceroy of Kush), a Viceroy of Kush under Siptah
Hori II (Viceroy of Kush), a son of Hori I who also served as Viceroy of Kush
Hori, an ancient Egyptian author who wrote Papyrus Anastasi I

Other uses
Höri, a municipality in Switzerland
Hori (music), a genre of semiclassical Indian music
Hori (slur), a derogatory term for a Māori New Zealander (from the Maorification of the name George)
Hori (surname), a Japanese surname
Hori hori, a Japanese multi-purpose knife
8500 Hori, an asteroid
Hori (Novel's character), a character from Godaan, Hindi novel by Premchand.

See also
 

Ancient Egyptian given names
Theophoric names